Maurice Hayes (8 July 1927 – 23 December 2017) was an Irish public servant and, late in life, an independent member of the 21st and 22nd Seanads. Hayes was nominated by the Taoiseach, Bertie Ahern, in 1997 and re-nominated in 2002. He also served, at the Taoiseach's request, as Chairman of the National Forum on Europe in the Republic of Ireland.

Hayes was voted European Person of the Year in 2003.

Early life
Hayes was born in Killough County Down, Northern Ireland, in 1927. He completed a PhD in English at the Queen's University Belfast, then taught at St Patrick's Grammar School in Downpatrick. He left teaching to become town clerk of Downpatrick the then administrative centre of County Down, succeeding his father in the role.

Public service career
In the troubled politics of Northern Ireland, where political parties tend to be sharply split along pseudo-ethno-nationalistic lines, Hayes was viewed as an even-handed observer. He wrote or contributed to major policy reports, such as the Patten Commission dealing with reforms to the Royal Ulster Constabulary (RUC), the police force later renamed the Police Service of Northern Ireland (PSNI).

Writing
Hayes also wrote numerous pieces of journalism, notably, and regularly, for the Irish Independent.  He was the author of three books of memoirs, Sweet Killough: Let Go Your Anchor; Black Puddings with Slim: A Downpatrick Boyhood; and Minority Verdict: Experiences Of A Catholic Civil Servant, as well as author or editor of works on conflict research, community relations and Irish writing.

Memberships
Hayes was a former Northern Ireland Ombudsman and Boundary Commissioner, and was Permanent Secretary of the Department of Health and Social Services. He was a former chairman of the Community Relations Council and the Acute Hospitals Review Group.

He was chairman of The Ireland Funds in the Republic of Ireland, a branch of a major charitable group with worldwide contributors, which has made significant grants to groups dealing with social and business problems.

Hayes was also a long-serving non-executive director of Independent News & Media Plc, retiring in 2009 towards the culmination of a long running battle for control of the group between the O'Reilly family and Denis O'Brien led to a re-structuring of the Board.

Hayes was nominated by the Taoiseach, Bertie Ahern, in 1997 and re-nominated in 2002.

He also served, at the Taoiseach's request, as Chairman of the National Forum on Europe in the Republic of Ireland. The approach he devised to educate the population on the arguments over European issues was so successful that many other European countries adopted similar methods.

In later life, Hayes was a member of the Royal Irish Academy and the Research Ethical Committee of Queen's University Belfast medical school, and a governor of the Linenhall Library, Belfast. He was a long-serving member of the Scholarship Board of the O'Reilly Foundation. He was also a board member at Regtel.

Hayes was asked by Mary Harney, when she was the Minister for Health in the Republic of Ireland, and the HSE to conduct a review into a scandal in the radiology department at Tallaght Hospital on the outskirts of Dublin.

Personal life
Hayes was a county hurler, who in the mid-1950s became County Secretary of the Down Gaelic Athletic Association (GAA) and set a ten-year plan for the county football team to become the first from Northern Ireland to win an All-Ireland football final. Within five years, Down had won their first All-Ireland trophy in 1960. They followed it with further successes in 1961, 1968, 1991 and 1994. No other Northern team won an All-Ireland title until Derry won the football title in 1993.

Hayes died in Downe Hospital after a long illness on 23 December 2017 at the age of 90.

Awards
Hayes was voted European Person of the Year in 2003.

He also received honorary doctorates from his alma mater; from both Queen's University Belfast and University of Ulster in the UK, as well as Trinity College, University of Dublin and National University of Ireland in the Republic of Ireland.

References

External links
 The O'Reilly Foundation - Scholarship Board, photo and short profiles

1927 births
2017 deaths
Civil servants from Northern Ireland
Down County Board administrators
Down hurlers
Independent members of Seanad Éireann
Independent News & Media
Irish Independent people
Irish sportsperson-politicians
Male non-fiction writers from Northern Ireland
Members of the 21st Seanad
Members of the 22nd Seanad
Members of the Royal Irish Academy
Nominated members of Seanad Éireann
Ombudsmen in Northern Ireland
O'Reilly Foundation
People from County Down
Secretaries of county boards of the Gaelic Athletic Association
21st-century writers from Northern Ireland